Lady from Nowhere is a 1936 American crime film directed by Gordon Wiles and starring Mary Astor, Charles Quigley and Thurston Hall.

Premise
After witnessing a gangland killing a young woman has to go into hiding.

Cast
 Mary Astor as Polly Dunlap  
 Charles Quigley as Earl Daniels  
 Thurston Hall as James Gordon Barnes  
 Victor Kilian as Zeke Hopper  
 Spencer Charters as Alexander Scorzo  
 Norman Willis as Ed Lustig, aka Alfred Brewster  
 Gene Morgan as Mike Dugan  
 Rita La Roy as Mabel Donner  
 Claudia Coleman as Dorothy Barnes  
 Matty Fain as Henchman Frankie  
 John Tyrrell as Henchman Nick  
 John Hamilton as Commissioner  
 George DeNormand as Chauffeur  
 Edwin Stanley as Editor  
 Frank Melton as Bert Withers  
 Jack Kennedy as Rube Wallace  
 Victor Potel as Abner  
 Horace Murphy as Lem  
 Gennaro Curci as Alex  
 Lowell Drew as Veterinary  
 Robert McKenzie as Constable  
 Edward LeSaint as Ed Van Zandt  
 Joseph E. Bernard as Conductor  
 C.L. Sherwood as First Fireman  
 Wedgwood Nowell
 Harry Tyler as Fletcher, Murdered Gangster

References

Bibliography
 Lowe, Denise. An Encyclopedic Dictionary of Women in Early American Films: 1895-1930. Routledge, 2014.

External links

1936 films
American crime films
1936 crime films
Films directed by Gordon Wiles
American black-and-white films
Columbia Pictures films
1930s English-language films
1930s American films